Laas may refer to:

People
Abduqaadir Laas  (born 1990), Somalian Military officer 
Ave-Lii Laas (born 1999), Estonian footballer
Endel Laas (1915–2009), Estonian forest scientist and professor
Ernst Laas (1837–1885), German philosopher
Karl Laas (1908–1967), Estonian long-distance runner
Mait Laas (born 1970), Estonian animated film director

Places

France
 Laas, Gers
 Laas, Loiret
 Laàs, in the Pyrénées-Atlantiques département

Elsewhere 
 Laas (Greece), a city of ancient Laconia
 Laas, South Tyrol, a municipality in South Tyrol, Italy

Acronym
 Laboratory for Analysis and Architecture of Systems, a research laboratory linked with the French National Centre for Scientific Research
 Local-area augmentation system, an aircraft landing system 
 Lighting as a service (LaaS)
 Logging as a service (LaaS)

Estonian-language surnames